A paw is the soft foot-like part of a mammal, generally a quadruped, that has claws.

Common characteristics 
The paw is characterised by thin, pigmented, keratinised, hairless epidermis covering subcutaneous collagenous and adipose tissue, which make up the pads. These pads act as a cushion for the load-bearing limbs of the animal. The paw consists of the large, heart-shaped metacarpal or palmar pad (forelimb) or metatarsal or plantar pad (rear limb), and generally four load-bearing digital pads, although there can be five or six toes in the case of domestic cats and bears (including giant panda). A carpal pad is also found on the forelimb which is used for additional traction when stopping or descending a slope in digitigrade species. Additional dewclaws can also be present.

The paw also includes a horn-like, beak shaped claw on each digit. Though usually hairless, certain animals do have fur on the soles of their paws.  An example is the red panda, whose furry soles help insulate them in their snowy habitat.

Animals with paws 
 Felids, such as cats and tigers; some of these animals may have toe tufts
 Canids, such as dogs and foxes
 Rabbits and other lagomorphs have paws with very sharp nails and have no pads underneath them
 Bears and raccoons
 Weasels and other mustelids
 Rodents

Gallery

See also 

 Claw
 Digitigrade

References

Bibliography
 Maine Coon Polydactyl International

Mammal anatomy